was a Japanese sprinter. He competed in the men's 400 metres at the 1932 Summer Olympics.

References

External links

1907 births
2000 deaths
Athletes (track and field) at the 1932 Summer Olympics
Japanese male sprinters
Olympic athletes of Japan
Place of birth missing